Thrikkakkara South is a village in Ernakulam district of Kerala.

Areas in Kalamassery-Thrikkakkara-Kakkanad urban area
Kalamassery
Thrikkakkara North
Thrikkakkara South
Kakkanad
Vazhakkala

Suburbs of Kochi